Ohannes is a male given name with Armenian roots. Spelling variants include Hovannes, Oganes, and Ohan. The surnames Oganezov and Oganessian are derived from it. Notable people with the name include:

People
Loris Ohannes Chobanian (born 1933), American composer 
Ohannés Gurekian (1902–1984), Armenian architect
Ohannes Kurkdjian (1851–1903), Armenian photographer
Oganez Mkhitaryan (born 1962), Russian football coach and player
Ohannes Tchekidjian (born 1929), Armenian composer and conductor 
Onno Tunç (1948–1996), Turkish musician
Oganes Zanazanyan (1946–2015), Armenian football coach and player

See also
Hovhannes (disambiguation)
Ohan (disambiguation)
Ohanian